A peeler is a metal blade attached to a handle that is used for peeling vegetables.

Peeler may also refer to:

People
 Anthony Peeler (born 1969), American professional basketball player
 Bob Peeler (born 1952), American politician
 Harvey S. Peeler, Jr. (born 1948), American politician
 Nicole D. Peeler (born 1978), American author
 Walter Peeler (1887–1968), Australian recipient of the Victoria Cross

Other uses
 "The Peeler", a short story by Flannery O'Connor
 Peeler (law enforcement), British and Irish slang for a police officer
 Bronc Peeler, an American comic strip cowboy
 Peeler Lake, a lake in Mono County, California